Ariel Mamede Sousa (born 24 May 1989) is a Brazilian football manager.

Honours
Jaraguá
Campeonato Goiano Segunda Divisão: 2019

References

External links
 Futebol de Goyaz profile 
 

1989 births
Living people
Sportspeople from Goiânia
Brazilian football managers
Campeonato Brasileiro Série C managers
Vila Nova Futebol Clube managers
Boa Esporte Clube managers
Grêmio Esportivo Anápolis managers